Maria Epple Beck (born 11 March 1959) is a German retired alpine skier. She is the 1978 giant slalom world champion. She is the sister of Irene Epple.

References

External links 
 
 

German female alpine skiers
1959 births
Living people
People from Ostallgäu
Sportspeople from Swabia (Bavaria)
Olympic alpine skiers of West Germany
Alpine skiers at the 1976 Winter Olympics
Alpine skiers at the 1980 Winter Olympics
Alpine skiers at the 1984 Winter Olympics